Frederic Hale Parkhurst (November 5, 1864 – January 31, 1921) was an American politician.  He was the 52nd Governor of Maine.

Biography
He graduated from Washington, D.C.'s Columbian Law School (now George Washington University Law School) in 1887 and became an attorney in Bangor. He soon abandoned the law for business, and became partner with his father in a successful leather manufacturing and retail business.

A Republican, he served on the Bangor City Council from 1893 to 1894 and was the council's president in 1894. He was a member of the Maine House of Representatives from 1895 to 1896 and 1899 to 1902. He was a Delegate to the 1900 Republican National Convention.  Parkhurst was also a member of the Maine Militia, serving as Commissary General with the rank of colonel from 1901 to 1904.

From 1907 to 1908 Parkhurst was a member of the Maine State Senate, and he was chairman of the Maine Republican Party from 1914 to 1916. In 1920, he defeated incumbent Carl Milliken in Maine's Republican primary for governor. After winning the general election in September, Parkhurst became ill during the period between winning the election and his inauguration. Parkhurst managed to leave his sickbed to take the oath of office, but died of pneumonia just three weeks later. He was buried at Mount Hope Cemetery in Bangor.

His 26 days as Governor make his term one of the shortest in Maine history; the record belongs to Nathaniel Haskell, who served for 25 hours in 1953. Senate President Percival Proctor Baxter, also a Republican, finished Parkhurst's term in office.

References

Frederic Hale Parkurst at National Governors Association

1864 births
1921 deaths
George Washington University Law School alumni
Maine lawyers
Politicians from Bangor, Maine
Republican Party members of the Maine House of Representatives
Republican Party Maine state senators
Republican Party governors of Maine
Deaths from pneumonia in Maine
Burials in Maine
Maine Republican Party chairs